Metsi-Maholo is a community council located in the Mafeteng District of Lesotho. Its population in 2006 was 21,480.

Villages
The community of Metsi-Maholo includes the villages of Bokone (Ha Monokoa), Bongalla, Ha Bakhomi, Ha Boranta, Ha Chele, Ha Fako, Ha Hlelesoa, Ha Kalinyane, Ha Keketsi, Ha Khame, Ha Khetsi, Ha Khoro, Ha Koki, Ha Leburu, Ha Lenonyane, Ha Leteketa, Ha Letšoara, Ha Lijane, Ha Likoabe, Ha Mabotse, Ha Maoela, Ha Mapitse (Kalichane), Ha Masia, Ha Masoetsa, Ha Masoli, Ha Matetoane, Ha Matlokotsi, Ha Matsepe, Ha Mochekoane, Ha Moeletsi, Ha Mofolo, Ha Mofota, Ha Mohapi, Ha Mojela, Ha Mojela (Tša-Kholo), Ha Mokhasi, Ha Mokhisa, Ha Mokoatsi, Ha Mokone, Ha Moqhosha, Ha Morakanyane, Ha Mosotho, Ha Motholo, Ha Motšoari, Ha Mpeli, Ha Mphulenyane, Ha Mutsoe, Ha Naile, Ha Nkete, Ha Nkhanti, Ha Ntaote, Ha Phechela, Ha Polaki, Ha Rachabeli, Ha Rakherere, Ha Rakhoboko, Ha Ramatsie, Ha Rammoko, Ha Ramohapi, Ha Ramosiuoane, Ha Ramotoho, Ha Ranko, Ha Rantai, Ha Rapata, Ha Ratoeba, Ha Seng, Ha Shoaeane, Ha Shoeane, Ha Tang, Ha Tankiso, Ha Theko, Ha Thoahlane, Ha Tholeli, Ha Thulo, Ha Tjobase, Ha Tšoane, Khotsoaneng, Koung, Lekhalong, Likhetleng, Majakaneng, Makhanyeng, Makhemeng, Malimong, Malumeng, Mamphaneng, Marakong, Matlatseng, Motse-Mocha, Sekameng, Sekhutloaneng and Thabana-Ntšonyana.

References

External links
 Google map of community villages

Populated places in Mafeteng District